William Erskine Stevenson (March 18, 1820November 29, 1883) was an American cabinet-maker, farmer, and Republican politician from Parkersburg, West Virginia. He was the third governor of West Virginia from 1869 until 1871.

Early and family life
William was the son of Irish immigrants, and was born in Warren, Pennsylvania. His parents, James and Elizabeth (Erskine) Stevenson, had immigrated to America in 1817. In 1829 James moved his young family to Pittsburgh to work as a cabinet-maker. William apprenticed at his father's trade, then went into business for himself. In September 1842 he married Sarah Clotworthy, another second generation American whose parents came from Belfast, Ireland.

Career

Largely self-educated, Stevenson began his interest in politics as a labor spokesman. He was associated with the Pittsburgh unit of the National Reform Association, and advocated the ten-hour workday. He became an adherent of the new Republican Party, and shared in their early success by being elected to the Pennsylvania House of Representatives in 1857. However, later that same year he bought a small farm and moved to Wood County in western Virginia.

Stevenson remained an advocate of labor and also supported continuing the union. As the American Civil War grew closer, a warrant was issued for his arrest in 1859. He was accused of sedition against the state for circulating a book, "The Impending Crisis of the South" by Hinton Rowan Helper, that criticized slavery. Hoping to make a case for the freedom of ideas, Stevenson attempted to surrender to the Wood County sheriff, who declined to arrest him. But, from this point forward, he became a militant anti-slavery and pro-union activist.

In 1860 Stevenson was a delegate to the Republican national convention in Chicago. At home, he campaigned for Abraham Lincoln. When war finally came, Stevenson became an outspoken advocate to the creation of the state of West Virginia. He was a delegate for Wood County in the constitutional conventions of 1862 and 1863. When the second of these successfully withdrew from Virginia and statehood was achieved, he was elected to the West Virginia State Senate.

Stevenson served in the state senate from 1863 until 1868, and during the last three years became its president. That year he was elected on the Republican ticket as Governor of West Virginia. He served as governor for two years, but lost his bid for reelection in 1870. After the bulk of his political career, he became a partner in the Parkersburg State Journal and a director of the West Virginia Oil Land Company.

Stevenson had two more major political tasks, he served as a Presidential Elector in 1872 as he had in 1864.

Death and legacy

Stevenson died at his home on Juliana Street in Parkersburg, West Virginia, and is buried in the Riverview Cemetery there.

References

The portrait of Governor William Stevenson was painted by artist Dorothy Horne Decker, of Vienna, WV.

1820 births
1883 deaths
People from Warren, Pennsylvania
Republican Party members of the Pennsylvania House of Representatives
Republican Party West Virginia state senators
Republican Party governors of West Virginia
Politicians from Parkersburg, West Virginia
People of West Virginia in the American Civil War
Activists from West Virginia
American people of Irish descent
Businesspeople from West Virginia
19th-century American politicians
19th-century American businesspeople
Presidents of the West Virginia State Senate